Got Live If You Want It! may refer to:

Got Live If You Want It! (album), the first live album by British rock band The Rolling Stones, released in the US in 1966
Got Live If You Want It! (EP), the final official EP by The Rolling Stones, released in the UK in 1965